"Automatically Sunshine" is a song written by Smokey Robinson and released as a single by Motown singing group The Supremes as the second single from their popular album Floy Joy in 1972.

The single featured Jean Terrell and original Supreme Mary Wilson sharing lead vocals on the song. Floy Joy was one of the group's final albums recorded at Motown's famed Detroit studio, Hitsville U.S.A. On the US soul chart, "Automatically Sunshine" reached number twenty-one and was the Supremes' final top 40 US hit for four years peaking at number thirty-seven on the Billboard Hot 100, while it became the group's third consecutive top-ten single on the UK Singles Chart peaking at number ten.

Charts

Personnel
Lead vocals by Mary Wilson and Jean Terrell
Background vocals by Mary Wilson, Jean Terrell and Cindy Birdsong
Additional vocals by The Andantes
Produced and written by Smokey Robinson
Instrumentation by The Funk Brothers

References

1972 singles
1972 songs
The Supremes songs
Songs written by Smokey Robinson
Song recordings produced by Smokey Robinson
Motown singles